German submarine U-628 was a Type VIIC U-boat built for Nazi Germany's Kriegsmarine for service during World War II.
She was laid down on 7 August 1941 by Blohm & Voss, Hamburg as yard number 604, launched on 29 April 1942 and commissioned on 25 June 1942 under Kapitänleutnant Heinrich Hasenschar.

Design
German Type VIIC submarines were preceded by the shorter Type VIIB submarines. U-628 had a displacement of  when at the surface and  while submerged. She had two shafts and two  propellers.

U-628 was fitted with five  torpedo tubes (four fitted at the bow and one at the stern), fourteen torpedoes, one  SK C/35 naval gun, 220 rounds, and a  C/30 anti-aircraft gun. The boat had a complement of between forty-four and sixty.

Service history
The boat's service began on 25 June 1942 with training as part of the 5th U-boat Flotilla. She was transferred to the 1st Flotilla on 1 December 1942 for active service in the North Atlantic.

Wolfpacks
U-628 took part in six wolfpacks, namely:
 Ungestüm (11 – 30 December 1942)
 Hartherz (3 – 7 February 1943)
 Ritter (11 – 26 February 1943)
 Without name (15 – 18 April 1943)
 Specht (19 April – 4 May 1943)
 Fink (4 – 6 May 1943)

Fate
U-628 was sunk on 3 July 1943 in the North Atlantic NW of Cape Ortegal in position ; bombed and depth charged by RAF Liberator aircraft (FL963) of 224/J Squadron out of RAF St Eval in Cornwall. All 49 hands were lost.

Summary of raiding history

References

Bibliography

External links

Ships lost with all hands
German Type VIIC submarines
1941 ships
U-boats commissioned in 1941
U-boats sunk by depth charges
U-boats sunk by British aircraft
U-boats sunk in 1943
World War II submarines of Germany
World War II shipwrecks in the Atlantic Ocean
Ships built in Hamburg
Maritime incidents in July 1943